Annalisa Malara is an Italian doctor who treated the first COVID-19 patient in Italy.  She is an intensivist and anaesthesiologist in Codogno, Italy. She was named "personality of the year" by SkyTg24, a satellite news channel.

She has written a book about her work.

In October 2020, she was awarded as Knight of the Order of Merit of the Italian Republic.

References

Further reading
 https://www.reuters.com/article/us-health-coronavirus-italy-first-doctor-idUSKBN2AK0BA
 https://www.escardio.org/Education/COVID-19-and-Cardiology/diagnosing-the-first-covid-19-patient-in-italy-codogno
 https://www.ilgiorno.it/milano/cronaca/premio-rosa-camuna-annalisa-malara-1.5838711
 https://milano.repubblica.it/cronaca/2020/12/21/news/annalisa_malara_coronavirus_codogno_paziente_uno_rosa_camuna_regione_lombardia-279303329/
 https://www.ilfattoquotidiano.it/2020/12/05/annalisa-malara-il-personaggio-dellanno-di-skytg24-la-dottoressa-che-il-20-febbraio-diagnostico-il-primo-caso-di-covid-a-codogno/6027682/
 https://www.dailyherald.com/article/20201216/news/312169986

External links
 

Italian anesthesiologists
COVID-19 pandemic in Italy
People from Codogno
Knights of the Order of Merit of the Italian Republic
1982 births
Living people
Italian intensivists
Women anesthesiologists
21st-century women physicians
Italian women physicians